The following is a list of notable deaths in February 1992.

Entries for each day are listed alphabetically by surname. A typical entry lists information in the following sequence:
 Name, age, country of citizenship at birth, subsequent country of citizenship (if applicable), reason for notability, cause of death (if known), and reference.

February 1992

1
Mohan Choti, 57, Indian actor.
Maurice John Dingman, 78, American bishop of the Catholic Church.
Jean Hamburger, 82, French physician, surgeon and essayist.
Irving Kaufman, 81, American judge, pancreatic cancer.
Hussein Kamel Montasser, 68, Egyptian basketball player.
Frank Spitzer, 65, Austrian-American mathematician.

2
Philip Erenberg, 82, American gymnast and Olympic silver medalist.
Theodor Gaster, 85, British-American biblical scholar.
Paul Huston, 66, American basketball player.
Bert Parks, 77, American television personality and Miss America and host, lung cancer.
Vladimír Čech, 77, Czechoslovak film director and screenwriter.

3
Otto Arndt, 71, East German politician.
Junior Cook, 57, American hard bop tenor saxophone player.
Knut Fridell, 83, Swedish freestyle wrestler and Olympic champion.
Mário Peixoto, 83, Brazilian film director.
Jan van Aartsen, 82, Dutch politician and jurist.

4
Alan Davies, 30, British footballer, suicide by carbon monoxide poisoning.
John Dehner, 76, American actor (The Right Stuff, The Doris Day Show, The Boys from Brazil), emphysema.
Lisa Fonssagrives, 80, Swedish-American fashion model.
Vittorio Gelmetti, 65, Italian composer.
Gurmit Singh Kullar, 84-85, Indian Olympic field hockey player (1932).
Ned Locke, 72, American television personality and radio announcer, liver cancer.
Gianni Rizzo, 67, Italian film actor.

5
Sergio Méndez Arceo, 84, Mexican Roman Catholic bishop and human rights activist.
Nicomedes Santa Cruz, 66, Peruvian singer, songwriter and musicologist.
Paul A. Freund, 83, American jurist and law professor, cancer.
Joseph MacManus, 21, Irish republican volunteer, shot.
Carter Manasco, 90, American politician.
Harry Mattos, 80, American gridiron football player.
Ernest Thornton, 86, British politician.
Bill Wheatley, 82, American basketball player.

6
John Greenstock, 86, English cricket player.
Wayde Preston, 62, American actor (Colt .45, Sugarfoot, Captain America), colorectal cancer.
Felix Rexhausen, 59, German journalist, editor and author.
Cedric Sloane, 76, Australian cross-country skier.

7
Bob Allen, 75, English football player.
Radharaman Mitra, 94, Indian revolutionary Bengali writer.
Shinsuke Ogawa, 56, Japanese documentary film director, liver failure.
Gunnar Randers, 77, Norwegian physicist.
Buzz Sawyer, 32, American professional wrestler, drug overdose.

8
Fabian Gaffke, 78, American baseball player.
Baruch Lumet, 93, Polish-American actor.
Roland Robinson, 79, Australian poet and writer.
Bazoline Estelle Usher, 106, American educator.
Tom Williams, 51, American ice hockey player, heart attack.
Denny Wright, 67, English jazz guitarist, bladder cancer.

9
Leon Clore, 73, English film producer.
Willie Fagan, 74, Scottish football player.
Andor Földes, 78, Hungarian pianist, fall.
Jack Kinney, 82, American animator and film director (Pinocchio, Dumbo, The Adventures of Ichabod and Mr. Toad).
Boonsong Lekagul, 84, Thai medical doctor, biologist, and conservationist.

10
Vladimir Brovikov, 60, Soviet and Russian politician.
Byron Gentry, 78, American football player (Pittsburgh Pirates).
Alex Haley, 70, American author (Roots: The Saga of an American Family), heart attack.
Fred Hynes, 83, American sound engineer (West Side Story, The Sound of Music, Oklahoma!), five-time Oscar winner.
Yoshiko Okada, 89, Japanese stage and film actress.
Jim Pepper, 50, American musician,lymphoma.
Doyt Perry, 82, American football player and coach.
Meade Roberts, 61, American screenwriter, heart attack.

11
Patrick Crehan, 71, Irish basketball player.
Ray Danton, 60, American actor (The Rise and Fall of Legs Diamond, The George Raft Story, The Longest Day), kidney failure.
Johnny Garrett, 28, American convicted murderer, execution by lethal injection.
Adolph Giesl-Gieslingen, 88, Austrian train designer and engineer.
Robert W. Russell, 80, American playwright and writer for movies and documentaries.
Carlos Rein Segura, 94, Spanish politician.

12
Sandy Douglass, 87, American sailboat racer and designer.
Yehuda D. Nevo, 60, Middle Eastern archeologist living in Israel.
Stella Roman, 87, Romanian operatic soprano.
Bep van Klaveren, 84, Dutch boxer and Olympic featherweight champion.

13
Nikolai Bogolyubov, 82, Russian theoretical physicist.
Don Ettinger, 69, American gridiron football player.
Antun Motika, 89, Croatian artist.
Earl Rapp, 70, American baseball player and scout.
Dorothy Tree, 85, American actress, heart failure.
Bob den Uyl, 61, Dutch writer.
Warren Westlund, 65, American Olympic rower (1948).

14
Luigi Ghirri, 49, Italian artist and photographer, heart attack.
Holger Jernsten, 81, Swedish football player.
Roepie Kruize, 67, Dutch field hockey player and Olympian.
Alex Lovy, 78, American animator (The Flintstones, The Jetsons, Heathcliff).
Angelique Pettyjohn, 48, American actress, cervical cancer.
Helen Vela, 45, Filipina actress and radio and TV personality, colorectal cancer.
Gene Venzke, 83, American middle-distance runner and Olympian.

15
Hermann Axen, 75, German political activist.
María Elena Moyano, 33, Peruvian activist, murdered.
Shosaku Numa, 63, Japanese neuroscientist.
Gerhard Riege, 61, German politician, suicide by hanging.
William Schuman, 81, American composer, complications from hip surgery.
Edna Gardner Whyte, 89, American aviator.

16
Abbas al-Musawi, 39, Lebanese militant and co-founder of Hezbollah, missile strike.
Angela Carter, 51, English novelist, lung cancer.
Walter Franz, 80, German  theoretical physicist.
Alberto Gomes, 76, Portuguese football player.
George MacBeth, 60, Scottish poet.
Oleksander Ohloblyn, 92, Ukrainian historian.
Jânio Quadros, 75, Brazilian politician, president (1961).
Charles Carnegie, 11th Earl of Southesk, 98, British noble.
Opal Irene Whiteley, 94, American nature writer and diarist.
Herman Wold, 83, Norwegian-Swedish mathematician.

17
John Fieldhouse, Baron Fieldhouse, 63, British Royal Navy officer, surgical complications.
Alfred Hooke, 86, Canadian politician and writer.
Delio Morollón, 54, Spanish football player.
Forrest L. Vosler, 68, American Air Force radio operator, Medal of Honor recipient.

18
Sylvain Arend, 89, Belgian astronomer.
Roman Filippov, 56, Soviet actor, thromboembolism.
Robert Gittings, 81, English writer, biographer, playwright and poet.
Edith Hamlin, 90, American painter and muralist.
Wang Huayun, 84, Chinese politician.
James H. Polk, 80, American Army four-star general.

19
Narayan Shridhar Bendre, 81, Indian artist.
Mike Bucchianeri, 75, American gridiron football player.
Joseph Lyman Fisher, 78, American politician, member of the U.S. House of Representatives (1975–1981), bone cancer.
Takehiko Kanagoki, 77, Japanese Olympic basketball player (1936).
Felix Makasiar, 76, Filipino lawyer and Chief Justice.
Buddy O'Grady, 72, American basketball player and coach.
Vladimir Solomonovich Pozner, 87, Russian-French writer and translator.
Tojo Yamamoto, 65, American professional wrestler, suicide.

20
Muhammad Asad, 91, Austrian journalist, writer, political theorist, and diplomat.
Eugene R. Black, Sr., 93, American banker.
A. J. Casson, 93, Canadian artist.
Roberto D'Aubuisson, 48, Salvadoran militant, esophageal cancer.
Pierre Dervaux, 75, French operatic conductor, composer, and pedagogue.
Joan Dixon, 61, American actress.
John Kneubuhl, 71, American Samoan screenwriter, playwright and polynesian historian.
Dick York, 63, American actor (Bewitched, Inherit the Wind, Going My Way), emphysema.

21
William Arrowsmith, 67, American classicist, academic, and translator.
Charles L. Carpenter, 89, American naval admiral and genealogist.
Kate ter Horst, 85, Dutch housewife known as the Angel of Arnhem during the Battle of Arnhem, traffic collision.
Eva Jessye, 97, American conductor.
Jane Pickens Langley, 84, American singer, heart failure.
Henri Préaux, 80, French rowing coxswain and Olympic silver medalist.
Haruo Tanaka, 79, Japanese actor.

22
Sudirman Arshad, 37, Malaysian singer-songwriter, pneumonia.
Nicolas Bochatay, 27, Swiss Olympic speed skier (1992), skiing collision.
Oscar Broneer, 97, Swedish-American archaeologist.
Gilbert Chase, 85, American music historian, critic and author, pneumonia.
Jun Miki, 72, Japanese photographer and photojournalism pioneer.
Aarno Ruusuvuori, 67, Finnish architect.
Markos Vafiadis, 86, Greek politician and resistance fighter.
David Wilson, 84, English football player.
Paul Winter, 86, French discus thrower and Olympic medalist.
Kurt Wires, 72, Finnish Olympic canoer (1948, 1952).
Tadeusz Łomnicki, 64, Polish actor.

23
Joseph Armone, 74, American mobster (Gambino crime family).
Dwight Bolinger, 84, American linguist and academic.
Valentino Bompiani, 93, Italian publisher, writer and playwright, heart failure.
Avraham Harman, 77, Israeli diplomat and academic administrator.
Maurice Raes, 85, Belgian racing cyclist.
Einar Schanke, 64, Norwegian composer, pianist, and theatrical producer.

24
Ljubo Benčić, 87, Yugoslav football player.
Clarrie Jordan, 69, English football player.
August Lešnik, 77, Croatian football player.
Doreen Montgomery, 78, British screenwriter.

25
Zlatko Celent, 39, Yugoslav Olympic rower (1980), traffic accident.
Guy Deghy, 79, Hungarian-British actor.
Andrews Engelmann, 90, Russian-German actor.
Harry D. Felt, 89, American naval aviator.
F. Russell Miller, 78, New Zealand politician.
Carl Monssen, 70, Norwegian rower.
Ollie O'Toole, 79, American actor.
Viktor Reznikov, 39, Soviet singer-songwriter, traffic collision.
Bernard Michael Shanley, 88, American lawyer and politician.

26
Larry Banks, 60, American R&B and soul singer, songwriter, and record producer.
Marguerite Ross Barnett, 49, American academic, cancer.
Gerrit Schulte, 76, Dutch racing cyclist.
Stuart Nash Scott, 85, American lawyer and diplomat, stroke.
Honey Sri-Isan, 20, Thai singer, traffic collision.
Jean R. Yawkey, 83, American sports executive (Boston Red Sox) and philanthropist.
 Military personnel killed during the Khojaly massacre:
Alif Hajiyev, 38, Azerbaijani officer and war hero.
Tofig Huseynov, 37, Azerbaijani commander and war hero.
Hikmet Nazarli, 25, Azerbaijani soldier and war hero.
Janpolad Rzayev, 24, Azerbaijani soldier and war hero.
Araz Selimov, 31, Azerbaijani soldier and war hero.

27
Chuck Drazenovich, 64, American gridiron football player.
Algirdas Julien Greimas, 74, Lithuanian-French literary scientist.
Samuel Ichiye Hayakawa, 85, Canadian-American academic and politician, member of the U.S. Senate (1977–1983), Alzheimer's disease.
Katharine Luomala, 84, American anthropologist.
John Rothenstein, 90, British art historian.
Antoine Wehenkel, 82, Luxembourgian politician and engineer.

28
Antonio Bravo, 86, Spanish-Mexican film and television actor.
Bolesław Orliński, 92, Polish aviator, military, sports and test pilot.
Enzo Pulcrano, 48, Italian actor and writer.
Jackie Wiid, 62, South African swimmer and Olympian.
Bert Wilson, 42, Canadian ice hockey player, stomach cancer.

29
Yavar Aliyev, 35, Azerbaijani soldier, killed in battle.
Ada Colangeli, 78, Italian actress.
Don Heinrich, 61, American football player, coach, and announcer, cancer.
Shamshi Kaldayakov, 61, Kazakh composer ("Menıñ Qazaqstanym").
Ferenc Karinthy, 70, Hungarian novelist, playwright, and journalist.
La Lupe, 55, Cuban-American singer, heart attack.
Teófilo Villavicencio Marxuach, 79, Puerto Rican radio broadcaster.
Ruth Pitter, 94, British poet.
Sergei Senyuskin, 34, Azerbaijani soldier, killed in battle.
Eddie Wares, 76, Canadian ice hockey player.
Mevhibe İnönü, 97, First Lady of Turkey as wife of president İsmet İnönü.

References 

1992-02
 02